Otis Carroll Lawry (November 1, 1893 – October 23, 1965) was an American professional baseball infielder with the Philadelphia Athletics of Major League Baseball. Nicknamed "Rabbit, he played in MLB during World War I from 1916 to 1917. Lawry was born in Fairfield, Maine, and died in China, Maine. He is buried in Maplewood Cemetery in Fairfield. Lawry attended the University of Maine, where he played college baseball for the Black Bears from 1914 to 1916.

References

External links

1893 births
1965 deaths
People from Fairfield, Maine
Baseball players from Maine
Major League Baseball infielders
Philadelphia Athletics players
Maine Black Bears baseball players
Baltimore Orioles (IL) players
Jersey City Skeeters players
Toronto Maple Leafs (International League) players